The English game of dwile flonking (also dwyle flunking) is an East Anglian pub sport, involving two teams of twelve players, each taking a turn to dance around the other while attempting to avoid a beer-soaked dwile (cloth) thrown by the non-dancing team.

"Dwile" is a knitted floor cloth, from the Dutch dweil, meaning "mop", with the same meaning in East Anglian dialect, and "flonk" is probably a corruption of flong, an old past tense of fling.

History 

The origins of Dwile Flonking are disputed with some saying that it dates back to the middle ages, with the 2002 book Schott's Miscellanies claiming that a variant of the game is depicted in a 16th-century painting by Pieter Brueghel the Elder: Children's games.

Others say that it is an invented tradition from the 1960s, with one story attributing the game to a group of Suffolk printing apprentices in 1966. The game also appeared in a sketch in an episode of Michael Bentine's comedy series It's a Square World some years prior to that.

A game of dwile flonking was played at the Beccles Festival of Sport in 1966. According to BBC research, "No one can remember the score, although team members recalled feeling 'pretty fragile' the following morning."

Dwile flonking featured as an element in legal hearings, when assessing an application for a licence extension to cater for the dinner dance of the Waveney Valley Dwile Flonking Association. After the Waveney Valley Dwile Flonking Association appeared on The Eamonn Andrews television programme in 1967, requests for a flonking rule book were received from Australia, Hong Kong, and America.

Rules
According to the Friends of the Lewes Arms, "The rules of the game are impenetrable and the result is always contested."

A "dull witted person" is chosen as the referee or "jobanowl", and the two teams decide who flonks first by tossing a sugar beet. The game begins when the jobanowl shouts, "Here y'go t'gither!" "T'gither" or "together" at the end of a sentence in East Anglian dialect indicates you are addressing a group of people hence the occasional doubling of the word.

The non-flonking team joins hands and dances in a circle around a member of the flonking team, a practice known as "girting". The flonker dips his dwile-tipped "driveller" (a pole 2–3 ft long and made from hazel or yew) into a bucket of beer, then spins around in the opposite direction to the girters and flonks his dwile at them.

If the dwile misses completely it is known as a "swadge". When this happens, the flonker must drink the contents of an ale-filled "gazunder" (chamber pot ("goes-under" the bed)) before the wet dwile has passed from hand to hand along the line of now non-girting girters chanting the ceremonial mantra of "pot pot pot".

A full game comprises two "snurds", each snurd being one team taking a turn at girting. The jobanowl adds interest and difficulty to the game by randomly switching the direction of rotation and will levy drinking penalties on any player found not taking the game seriously enough.

Points are awarded as follows:
 +3: a "wanton" - a direct hit on a girter's head
 +2: a "morther" or "mawther - a body hit (mawther is a word in the local dialect meaning mother or woman more generally)
 +1: a "ripper" - a leg hit
 -1 per sober person at the end of the game

At the end of the game, the team with the most points wins, and will be awarded a ceremonial pewter gazunder.

Notes

Further reading
Finn, Timothy: Pub Games of England (Oleander Press)
"The art of Dwile Flonking" at BBC Suffolk, 11 September 2003.
 Dwile Flonking: council bans traditional pub sport under health and safety

External links
 Video of Dwyle Flunking at the Lewes Arms from 2008
 World Wide Words

Pub games